Feedzai is a data science company that develops real-time machine learning tools to identify fraudulent payment transactions and minimize risk in the financial services, retail, and e-commerce industries. The company has been classified as a unicorn startup since March 2021, after a Series D funding round pushed its value above $1 billion.

Feedzai is headquartered in Coimbra, Portugal. The company's U.S. headquarters is in San Mateo, California, in the Silicon Valley.

The company was founded in 2011 by Nuno Sebastião, Pedro Bizarro and Paulo Marques. The company first began selling its solutions for fraud detection and operational intelligence in Europe and later expanded to the United States in 2014.

References

Further reading 
The Forrester Wave™: Anti-Money-Laundering Solutions, Q3 2022
The Forrester Wave™: Enterprise Fraud Management, Q1 2016
Cool Vendors in Analytics and Business Intelligence, 2011 (Gartner)
Market Guide for Online Fraud Detection, 2011 (Gartner)
Market Guide for Operational Intelligence Platforms, 2015 (Gartner)
Aite Matrix: Leading Fraud & AML Machine Learning Platforms  (2021)

Technology companies of Portugal
Organisations based in Coimbra